The FIFA Youth Tournament Under-18 1950 Final Tournament was held in Austria.

Teams
The following teams entered the tournament:

  (host)

First round
For this round,  and  received a Bye.

Semifinals

Fifth-place match

Third place match

Final

External links
Results by RSSSF

1950
1950
1949–50 in European football
1949–50 in English football
1949–50 in French football
1949–50 in Austrian football
1949–50 in Dutch football
1949–50 in Swiss football
football
May 1950 sports events in Europe
1950s in Vienna
Sports competitions in Vienna
1950 in youth association football